The Gemenea is a left tributary of the river Suha in Romania. It flows into the Suha in Stulpicani.

References

Rivers of Romania
Rivers of Suceava County